John Cornes may refer to:
 Jerry Cornes (John Frederick Cornes, 1910–2001), English middle-distance runner, colonial officer, and schoolmaster
 John Cornes (rugby union) (1947–2014), Australian rugby union player